Cho Eun-ju is a South Korean news reporter and former beauty queen who represented South Korea on Miss World 2007. She won the title of World Miss University in 2010.

Personal life==
In personal life, Cho Eun-ju is married to a corporate executive, Beom jun Seo since 2012. The wedding ceremony took place at the Dynasty Hall of Hotel Shilla on 2012.<ref>[http://media.daum.net/entertain/enews/view?

 * World Miss University 2010 (1st Prize among the world)
 
Cho Eun-ju received B.A. from Hongik University in Jochiwon secondary campus (Sejong Campus).
She did not attend Hongik University in Seoul.

Social Activity
Cho Eun-ju is an ambassador of different NGO's including  UN Chronicle Ambassador, the Happy Foundation, the Korean Association of Children's Diabetes, the Korean Disabled People Society, and the Korean Society for Leukemia .

References

External links
 Official Website of Miss Korea

1983 births
Living people
World Miss University
South Korean actresses
Miss World 2007 delegates